Clare Pollard (born 1978, England) is a British writer (poet, novelist and playwright), literary translator and (prize jury) critic.

Early life and education 
Pollard was raised in Bolton. She was educated at Turton School in Bromley Cross. She read English at Cambridge University.

Career 
At age 19 Pollard published her first poetry collection, The Heavy-Petting Zoo (Bloodaxe Books Ltd. (1997)) In 2000, Pollard won a Society of Authors Eric Gregory Award. 

In 2004, her play The Weather was performed at the Royal Court Theatre and as well at the Munchner Kammerspiele. In 2007, My Male Muse, a radio documentary was broadcast on BBC Radio 4. 

In 2009, Pollard and James Byrne edited the Bloodaxe young poets showcase titled Voice Recognition: 21 Poets for the 21st Century. Pollard has been a Royal Literary Fund Writing Fellow at Essex University. In 2013, she was the judge for the inaugural international Hippocrates Prize for Young Poets, and she has since judged the PBS Next Generation list, Popescu European Poetry Translation Prize, Manchester International Poetry Prize, the Northern Writer's Awards and the T. S. Eliot Prize. 

From 2017 to 2022 she has been the editor of Modern Poetry in Translation. Instead she began to work as artistic director of the Winchester Poetry Festival in 2022, her poem Pollen was shortlisted for the Forward Prize for Best Single Poem 2022 and she published her debut novel , Delphi. The novel plot is about social satire on oracles, tarot cards and London family live in times of 2020 Covid pandemy lockdown and the shift of everyday life into the internet. It appeared in print 2022 by Fig Tree in the UK and by Avid Reader in the US as well as by Aufbau Verlag in Germany.

Private life
Clare Pollard currently (2023) lives in South London with her husband and two children.

Selected bibliography
 The Heavy Petting Zoo (1998).
 Bedtime (2002).
 The Weather (2004) Faber.
 Look, Clare! Look! (2005).
 Voice Recognition: 21 Poets for the 21st Century (2009).
 Changling (2011).
 Ovid's Heroines (2013).
 Incarnation (2017) Bloodaxe.
 Fierce Bad Rabbits: The Tales Behind Children's Picture Books (2019) Fig Tree.
 The Lives of the Female Poets (2019) Bad Betty Press.
 Delphi, novel, (2022) Fig Tree.

References

External links 
 
 Bloodaxe Books author profile page
 Interview with Clare Pollard by The Poetry Extension

Living people
1978 births
English women poets
Alumni of the University of Cambridge
Academics of the University of Essex
21st-century British poets
21st-century English women writers